Alex Burger can refer to:

 Alex Burger (musician), a Canadian country singer-songwriter
 Alex Burger (sailor), a South African sailor
 Alex Burger (screenwriter), n American playwright and screenwriter